The Tru Tones are a Saint Lucian band led by Ronald "Boo" Hinkson.  The band formed in the 1960s and had a significant following in the 70s in the United Kingdom.  They recorded five albums and several singles, most famously "Hungry Belly', "Burning Eyes" and "Sexy Thing" (remake of the Hot Chocolate song).

Since the Tru Tones break-up, Hinkson has had a successful solo career and toured across the world.

References
Saint Lucia Jazz

Saint Lucian musical groups